Baruch Gigi is a co-Rosh yeshiva of Yeshivat Har Etzion in Gush Etzion.

Biography
Baruch Gigi was born in Morocco and immigrated to Israel at the age of 11. He first attended Yeshivat Har Etzion as a student in 1974 after studying in a yeshiva high school in Haifa. He was ordained by the Chief Rabbinate of Israel and received a BEd degree from Herzog College. From 1982 to 1988, he taught in Yeshivat Ma'alot in the town of Ma'alot-Tarshiha and since then has been teaching in Yeshivat Har Etzion.

Together with Rabbi Yaaqov Medan, Gigi joined Rabbi Yehuda Amital and Rabbi Aharon Lichtenstein as a co-Rosh Yeshiva on January 4, 2006.

He also serves as the rabbi of the Sephardi synagogue in Alon Shvut  (the town where the yeshiva is located), and he teaches several classes in the women's institutions Midreshet Lindenbaum and Migdal Oz.

References

Living people
20th-century Moroccan Jews
Moroccan emigrants to Israel
Religious Zionist rosh yeshivas
Sephardi rabbis
Yeshivat Har Etzion
Israeli Orthodox rabbis
People from Haifa
Israeli settlers
Year of birth missing (living people)
Israeli soldiers
Jewish military personnel